Alexandra Ivanovna Nazarova (17 July 1940, Leningrad, USSR – 20 August 2019, Moscow, Russia) was a  Soviet and Russian film and theater actress. In 2001, the People's Artist of Russia was honoured.

Selected filmography
 But What If This Is Love (1961) as Nadya
 Sofiya Perovskaya (1967) as Sofiya Perovskaya
 Air Crew (1980) as passenger
 Love with Privileges (1989) as Antonina Petrovna
 Trifles of Life (1992) as teacher
 Brigada (2002) as Olga's Granny
 Muhtar's Return (2003) as Schmidt
 Night Watch (2004) as Svetlana's mother
 My Fair Nanny (2004–2008) as Nadezhda Mihailovna
 Lucky Trouble (2011) as  Nadya's Granny
 Brief Guide To A Happy Life (2012) as Bella
 Moms (2012) as neighbor
 Leningrad 46 (2014) as Serova
 Yolki 1914 (2014) as Maria Afanasyevna

References

External links

 Александра Назарова: «Ни на секунду о решении взять внучку к себе не пожалела»

1940 births
2019 deaths
Soviet film actresses
Soviet voice actresses
20th-century Russian actresses
Russian film actresses
Russian television actresses
21st-century Russian actresses
Actresses from Saint Petersburg
Russian voice actresses
People's Artists of Russia
Honored Artists of the RSFSR
Deaths from multiple organ failure
Burials in Troyekurovskoye Cemetery